Peyman Faratin (born September 16, 1965) is an Iranian/American computer scientist, and the founder of Robust Links, an Internet company building algorithms for creating and processing a knowledge graph.

Background 
Peyman completed his PhD in computer science under the supervision of Prof. Nicholas R. Jennings and Prof. Carles Sierra. He made significant contributions in the area of artificial intelligence, particularly to automated negotiation in multi-agent systems. He was then a research scientist at MIT's Computer Science and Artificial Intelligence (CSAIL) laboratory, working with David D. Clark in the Advanced Network Architecture group.

Peyman has over eighteen years of experience in design and implementation of online marketplaces. He graduated from University of London (EECS department) in 2000 completing his doctoral thesis on algorithms for online bargaining and auction mechanisms, with application to business process management and supply chain management in telecommunication domains. Between 2000-2008 he was a researcher at MIT (Computer Science and AI Lab and Sloan School of Management) working with David Clark (the chief Internet protocol architect between 81-89) on design, analysis and implementation of various online market mechanisms for multi-scaled provisioning, control and access problems to IP networks. Work included design of various markets at both layer 3 and 7 applications. Dr. Faratin joined Strands Inc. as VP of innovation in 2008, where he served as SVP of Innovation, responsible for the entire innovation pipeline of the $55 million startup. While at Strands, he envisaged, developed, marketed and sold a prediction market technology to BBVA. He has published over fifty scientific articles in peer reviewed publications, served as reviewer for the NSF and won multiple competitive NSF and DARPA grants.

Current 
Peyman is currently the founder of RobustLinks, funded by the National Science Foundation. The mission of RobustLinks is to use state of the art AI, NLP, and ML to compose Knowledge as a Service (KaaS). KaaS takes unstructured (textual) "big data" and reduces it to searchable knowledge. It integrates end-to-end technology stack that continuously gather, summarize and represent the semantics of unstructured text, in real-time and at scale. The derived semantics is then analyzed to condense the big data to a compact and searchable semantic graph.

Associations 
Peyman is a board member of number of emerging startups, as well as member of the Association of Computing Machinery, New York Academy of Science, the New York City CTO club and a visiting scholar at Courant Institute of Mathematics at NYU. Dr. Faratin is an active member of the NYC technology community.

Selected publications
 P. Faratin, D. Clark, P. Gilmore, S. Bauer, A. Berger and W. Lehr (2008). The Growing Complexity of Internet Interconnections: Communications and Strategies, no.72, 4th quarter 2008
 D. D.Clark, W. Lehr, S.J. Bauer, P. Faratin, R. Sami, and J. Wroclawski (2006): Overlay Networks and Future of the Internet. In Journal of Communications and Strategies, 3(63), pp 1–21,2006
 P. Faratin, C. Sierra and N. Jennings (2002): Using Similarity Criteria to Make Negotiation Trade-Offs. In Journal of Artificial Intelligence. 142 (2) 205-237
 P. Faratin, C. Sierra and N. Jennings (1997): Negotiation Decision Functions for Autonomous Agents in Int. Journal of Robotics and Autonomous Systems, 24(3-4):159-182

External links
RobustLinks
MIT personal page
Computer Science and Artificial Intelligence (CSAIL)

1965 births
Living people
American computer scientists
Iranian computer scientists
21st-century American inventors